Moving Pictures is the eighth studio album by Canadian rock band Rush, released on February 12, 1981 by Anthem Records. After touring to support their previous album, Permanent Waves (1980), the band started to write and record new material in August 1980 with longtime co-producer Terry Brown. They continued to write songs with a more radio-friendly sound, featuring tighter and shorter song structures compared with their earlier albums.

Moving Pictures received a positive reception from contemporary and retrospective music critics and became an instant commercial success, reaching number one in Canada and number 3 in both the United States and the United Kingdom. It remains Rush's highest-selling album in the United States, with 5 million copies sold. "Limelight", "Tom Sawyer" and "Vital Signs" were released as singles across 1981, and the instrumental "YYZ" was nominated for a Grammy Award for Best Rock Instrumental Performance. Rush supported the album on tour from February to July 1981.

Background and recording 
In June 1980, the band ended their 10-month tour of the United States, Canada and the United Kingdom in support of their previous album, Permanent Waves (1980). The tour was a commercial success for the group, becoming the first of their career to earn them a profit. During their stop in New York City a month prior, the band decided to scrap plans for a second live album in favor of making a new one in the studio. Cliff Burnstein of Mercury Records suggested the idea to the band, and Neil Peart was particularly enthusiastic about the new ideas that were being developed at sound checks and was keen to put them to tape. Geddy Lee and Alex Lifeson caught on to his enthusiasm. The trio pitched the idea to their manager and producer, who had already mapped out a two-year plan for them, but agreed to the change and cancelled the schedule. Lifeson looked back on this change of plan as the most important one in the band's history since the decision to record 2112 (1976), which became their breakthrough hit. Prior to starting on the album, Rush joined fellow rock band Max Webster to play on "Battle Scar", a track for their album Universal Juveniles (1980). During the sessions their lyricist Pye Dubois suggested a song that he thought was suitable for Rush; this was developed into "Tom Sawyer", the opening track on Moving Pictures.

The band retreated to Stony Lake, Ontario to write and arrange new material. The sessions were productive; "The Camera Eye" was the first song to be worked on which was quickly followed by "Tom Sawyer", "Red Barchetta", the instrumental "YYZ", and "Limelight". Lee noticed a change in Peart's lyrics during this time, which had started with Permanent Waves, towards more concise and direct words. Following these sessions, Rush returned to Phase One Studios with their longtime co-producer Terry Brown and prepared demos of these songs. The tracks were refined even further during subsequent rehearsals for a series of warm-up shows across the US in September and October 1980, during which "Tom Sawyer" and "Limelight" were performed live for the first time.

Moving Pictures was recorded at Le Studio in Morin-Heights, Quebec in October and November 1980. The studio was fitted out with a digital 48-track machine, which was unfamiliar to the band and necessitated them spending time familiarising with the equipment. The album was Brown's first digitally-produced album. Rush wanted to preserve the quality of their recordings as much as possible by transferring finished sections onto a fresh piece of tape and placing the original copy in storage, thereby reducing potential damage to the tape from frequent playback. They experimented with a pressure zone microphone, a type of boundary microphone that picks up direct sound and no reverberated signals, that was taped onto Peart's chest as he played the drums. The audio captured from it was used to pick up the ambience in the studio room and inserted into the final mix. Peart is seen wearing the microphone in the music video for "Vital Signs". The album was finished three days behind schedule due to delays caused by equipment failure.

Songs

Side one
It was the first Rush recording for which Lee used his 1972 Fender Jazz Bass, which provided a punchier lower end than he had been able to obtain with his usual Rickenbacker 4001. The bass became Lee's primary studio instrument from the recording of Counterparts (1993) onward. Lee said the group had more trouble with "Tom Sawyer" than any other song on Moving Pictures, and at times had doubts as to whether it would work. The band had technical difficulties with the computer that mixed the tracks, so they decided to manually operate the mixing desk with each member handling their own set of faders. Peart described it as "an enjoyable work" which took around a day and a half to record, "collapsing afterwards with raw, red, aching hands and feet". Its instrumental section grew from what Lee would play on his synthesiser during sound checks on tour, which initially was forgotten about until the band traded ideas on what the section should be. It became one of the group's best-known songs and a mainstay of subsequent live shows. The song was used as the opening music to the Brazilian dub of the spy TV show MacGyver.

Peart's lyrics for "Red Barchetta" were inspired by the short story "A Nice Morning Drive" by Richard S. Foster, originally written in the November 1973 edition of the American car magazine Road & Track. Lee described the tale as "Orwellian in nature" which deals with an individual taking their Barchetta on a fast ride despite the banning of high speeds and is chased after by hovering patrol cars for breaking the law. Instead of an MGB roadster as featured in the original story, Peart reported the Ferrari 166 MM Barchetta was the car that inspired the song's title. In 2007, Foster and Peart met for the first time and shared their mutual interest of BMW motorcycles, which was documented in an article titled "The Drummer, The Private Eye, and Me".

"YYZ" is an instrumental titled after the IATA airport code for Toronto Pearson International Airport; its rhythm is that of the letters "YYZ" in Morse code. It stemmed from the band's enjoyment of recording "La Villa Strangiato", a nine-minute instrumental on Hemispheres (1978), which they wanted to do again for Moving Pictures, only shorter. The music originated while Lee and Peart were jamming as a warm-up, during which Lee came up with the main riff and Peart suggested to have a more mellow section with Lee playing keyboards. "And then, almost out of nowhere, we had this song."

The lyrics for "Limelight" are autobiographical and based on Peart's own dissatisfaction with fame and its intrusion into one's personal life. The song contains two self-references: the first, the line "living in a fish-eye lens, caught in the camera eye" references the album's following track, "The Camera Eye", while the line "all the world's indeed a stage, and we are merely players", references the title of the band's first live album All the World's a Stage (1976), itself taken from William Shakespeare's comedy play As You Like It.

Side two
"The Camera Eye" is a two-part track with sections unofficially titled "New York" and "London". Peart wrote the lyrics after taking walks in both cities, recalling observations and the rhythms he felt during them. It remains the band's last song with a duration over 10 minutes, a frequent occurrence on their earlier albums. Its title refers to short pieces of the same name in the U.S.A. trilogy of novels written by American writer John Dos Passos, one of Dos Passos's works that Peart admired. The opening features audio of a bustling New York City from Richard Donner's Superman (1978) and the lines: "This is it Mac", "How about a tomato?", and "Fresh fruit".

"Witch Hunt" opens with faint voices which were recorded on the driveway Le Studio in sub-zero temperatures, with the band and studio staff shouting in a humorous way while drinking Scotch. Lifeson said one of his lines, "Fucking football", can be heard if the listener tries hard enough. The tracks were overdubbed multiple times until it sounded what Lee described as a "vigilante mob". The main riff was written by cover designer Hugh Syme on a synthesizer and double-tracked drums in one verse. "Witch Hunt" would become a part of the Fear series of songs, which includes "The Weapon" from Signals (1982), "The Enemy Within" from Grace Under Pressure (1984), and "Freeze" from Vapor Trails (2002), and went on reverse chronological order by the album, except "Freeze", which is the fourth part like normal chronological order.

"Vital Signs" was the last song that the band wrote for the album, which was pieced together at Le Studio. It features a sequencer part produced by an Oberheim OB-X synthesizer, and shows a distinct reggae flavour. Reggae influences in Rush's music were first heard on Permanent Waves, and would later be heard more extensively on their next two albums.

Artwork 

The cover was designed by Hugh Syme who estimated the artwork cost $9,500 to produce. Anthem Records refused to cover the entire bill, leaving the band to pay for the rest. It is a triple entendre; the front depicts movers who are carrying pictures. On the side, people are shown crying because the pictures passing by are emotionally "moving". Finally, the back cover has a film crew making a motion picture of the whole scene. It was photographed outside the Ontario Legislative Building at Queen's Park, Toronto. The pictures that are being moved are the band's Starman logo featured on the reverse cover of 2112 (1976), one of the Dogs Playing Poker paintings entitled A Friend in Need, and a painting that shows Joan of Arc being burned at the stake. The film crew on the back cover actually shot the scene, from which a single frame was used for the cover. This was revealed to Rush concertgoers several years later when the still image was shown on the stage projector which suddenly came to life as a film sequence.

Mike Dixon, one of the movers on the cover of Moving Pictures and the band's next album, Exit...Stage Left (1981), discussed the various people on the Moving Pictures cover. The first, Bobby King, seen furthest to the left, was a member of Syme's design team and is credited for assisting Syme on A Farewell to Kings, Hemispheres, and Archives. Dixon explained that King is not only one of the movers, but also the Starman logo and the man in the hat on the Hemispheres cover. The mover holding the Starman painting is Kelly Jay, singer of the Toronto band Crowbar who performed a show with Rush in 1973. Photographer Deborah Samuel is the Joan of Arc character, and her relatives are the family on the right. However, this conflicts with information provided in the Rush biography Chemistry, which states: "Hugh borrowed friends, neighbours and even his hairdresser's parents".

Release and reception

Moving Pictures was played in its entirety during Lee's visit to Rick Ringer's radio show on CHUM-FM in Toronto, on February 11, 1981. The album was released on the following day.

Kerrang! magazine listed the album at  among the "100 Greatest Heavy Metal Albums of All Time". In 2014, readers of the Rhythm voted Moving Pictures the greatest drumming album in the history of progressive rock. Moving Pictures and 2112 (1976) are the two Rush albums listed in 1001 Albums You Must Hear Before You Die.

Moving Pictures was played live in its entirety for the first time to open the second set during each show of Rush's 2010–11 Time Machine Tour.

In a knockout-style Facebook poll conducted in 2021, the album was voted the best album of the 1980s, narrowly beating out Depeche Mode's 1986 album Black Celebration to take the win with 52% of the vote. More than 22,100 votes were cast in the final round alone.

Reissues
The album was released on compact disc in 1984 by Mercury Records. Initial pressings were missing the first beat of "Tom Sawyer" by mistake but were corrected in subsequent releases. In 1997, Mercury Records released a digitally remastered version. The disc tray has a logo of three fingerprints with "The Rush Remasters" printed, a feature of all remastered albums from Moving Pictures through A Show of Hands, originally found on the cover of Retrospective II. The remaster restores all of the original artwork and lyrics found on the vinyl release (including the picture of Peart that had been left off of the original CD issue).

Moving Pictures was remastered twice in 2011. The first, by Andy VanDette, was for the "Sector" box sets which re-released all of Rush's Mercury-era albums. It is included in the Sector 2 box set. The second reissue was in April 2011, as a two-disc 30th-anniversary set. The first disc contains the standard stereo mix and the second, available as a DVD-Audio or Blu-ray disc, contains the album in a stereo and 5.1 surround sound mix with music videos as the three singles as bonus features.

In 2015, Moving Pictures was remastered for vinyl as part of the "12 Months of Rush" promotion. The mastering was also made available in a 24-bit/48 kHz digital format on various high-resolution online music stores. These remasters have less dynamic range compression than the 1997 and 2011 versions. Sean Magee remastered the album from an analogue copy of the original digital master tape using a 192 kHz sample rate. However, as Moving Pictures was originally mixed on digital equipment at 16-bit/44.1 kHz, no audio above 22 kHz exists in the original master or any of the remasters, which explains why many digital music stores only sell the album with 48 kHz as the maximum available rate.

The band released a 40th anniversary edition of Moving Pictures on April 15, 2022. The five record set includes the 2015 remaster and a previously unreleased live recording of their show at Maple Leaf Gardens in Toronto on March 25, 1981.

Track listing

Personnel
Credits are adapted from the album's 1981 liner notes.

Rush
 Geddy Lee – bass guitars, keyboards, bass pedals, vocals
 Alex Lifeson – 6- and 12-string electric and acoustic guitars, Moog Taurus pedals
 Neil Peart – drums, timbales, gong, orchestra bells, glockenspiel, wind chimes, bell tree, crotales, cowbell, plywood

Additional musician
 Hugh Syme – synthesizer (on "Witch Hunt")

Production
 Rush – production, arrangements
 Terry Brown – production, arrangements
 Paul Northfield – engineering
 Robbie Whelan – assistant engineering
 Albert, Huey, Dewey, Louie – computerized companions
 Peter Jensen – digital mastering, editing
 Bob Ludwig – mastering and remastering
 Hugh Syme – art direction, graphics, cover concept
 Deborah Samuel – photography

Charts

Weekly charts

Year-end charts

Certifications

References

External links
 

Moving Pictures  (Adobe Flash) at Radio3Net (streamed copy where licensed)

1981 albums
Rush (band) albums
Anthem Records albums
Mercury Records albums
Albums produced by Terry Brown (record producer)
Albums recorded at Le Studio